Atlantoscia is a genus of woodlice in the family Philosciidae. There are about seven described species in Atlantoscia.

Species
These seven species belong to the genus Atlantoscia:
 Atlantoscia floridana (Van Name, 1940)
 Atlantoscia inflata Campos-Filho & Araujo, 2015
 Atlantoscia ituberasensis Campos-Filho, Lisboa & Araujo, 2013
 Atlantoscia meloi Campos-Filho & Araujo, 2015
 Atlantoscia petronioi Campos-Filho, Contreira & Lopes-Leitzke, 2012
 Atlantoscia rubromarginata Araujo & Leistikow, 1999
 Atlantoscia sulcata Campos-Filho, Lisboa & Araujo, 2013

References

Woodlice
Articles created by Qbugbot